Enrique Ramón Morris de Olea, also known as Henry Morris or Morris II (1874 - Unknown), was an Anglo-Filipino football pioneer and a prominent forward for FC Barcelona. His brothers, Samuel and Miguel, also played football, and together with them, he was one of the first pioneers of football in Catalonia, playing for several experimental teams in the 1890s such as Barcelona Football Club and Sociedad de Foot-Ball de Barcelona. His brothers also played for Barcelona, being the first Filipinos to join FC Barcelona ahead of the likes of Manuel Amechazurra and Paulino Alcántara.

Enrique was a member of the Hispania AC side that won the 1900–01 Copa Macaya, which was the very first football competition played on the Iberian Peninsula.

Early years
Enrique was born in the Philippines to an English father (James Morris) and a Basque mother. In 1886 the family moved to Barcelona, where his father had been transferred to run the Barcelona Tramways Company Limited. On the grounds near the Hippodrome of Can Tunis, their father taught his three sons Samuel, Enrique (Henry) and Miguel (Júnior) the practice of football, a sport that was practically unknown in the city at the time. Together with his older brother, Samuel, he was one of the first pioneers of football in Catalonia, being part of the first known club to have played football in the city, the Barcelona Cricket Club (founded in 1891 by Britons), since they played cricket in the summer and then football in the winter (which was common at the time).

Barcelona Football Club

In 1892, the Morris brothers meet James Reeves, who approached the club's members to propose them the idea of creating a well-organized football club, and the Morris were among the first to join him, as they were also in love with the game. The Morris were crucial for Reeves to succeed in finding enough people to assemble two teams as they were Reeves' highest promoters of football in the city, thus playing a vital role in the formation of the Barcelona Football Club in late 1892, and together with Reeves, they were crucial in its success.

This entity held the first known football match in the city, which was held at Hippodrome of Can Tunis on 25 December 1892. It remains unclear if they actually played in this match or not, but they surely played on 12 March 1893, in the historic match between a blue team captained by Mr. Cochran and a red one led by Reeves, and interestingly, the brothers were on opposite teams, with Enrique playing for the Blues as a forward while Samuel represented the reds as a goalkeeper, and despite failing to score against his brother, his side won 2-1. Together with their younger brother, Miguel, the three of them appeared in what is regarded to be the oldest photograph of a football team in Spain, a photo of these two sides before the match on 12 March, with Miguel being only a 13-year-old at the time.

Sociedad de Foot-Ball de Barcelona
In 1894, the British Club de Barcelona changed its name and become known as Sociedad de Foot-Ball de Barcelona, and also changed fields, leaving the Hippodrome of Can Tunis to go to the Velódromo de la Bonanova, as Reeves was looking for a place of easier access to the city center, but what did not change was Enrique's goalscoring instincts, standing out as a great scorer at Can Tunis and Bonanova between 1892 and 1896. Enrique played several training matches (Blues vs Reds) and several friendlies against teams from Sant Martí and Torelló, scoring once against the latter on 24 March 1895, thus helping his side to an 8–3 victory.

Hispania AC

From 1899 onwards numerous teams appeared in the city, including Wild and Gamper's FC Barcelona, Català FC, Sociedad Española and Hispania AC, with the Morris joining the latter in 1900. Together with John Parsons and captain Gustavo Green, the Morris helped Hispania AC win the very first football competition played on the Iberian Peninsula, the 1900–01 Copa Macaya, with Enrique and Samuel, in particular, playing a pivotal role in helping Hispania become the very first Spanish club to win an official title, Samuel as a goalkeeper and Enrique as a forward, netting two goals, one each in 0–10 and 14–0 trashings of Franco-Española.

FC Barcelona
In 1902, the three Morris brothers reinforced FC Barcelona during its participation in the Copa de la Coronación (predecessor of Copa del Rey), and they played two official matches for them: The semi-finals against Real Madrid CF (then Madrid FC), which was the very first El Clásico, and the final, where Barça were defeated 2–1 by Club Vizcaya (a combination of players from Athletic Club and Bilbao Football Club).

After this parenthesis with Barça, the Morris brothers continued to play at Hispania AC until 1903, when the club was dissolved for lack of players, so they then join FC Barcelona on a permanent basis, playing for the club for two years until 1905, and helping Barça win the Catalan championship in 1904–05. Later, in the 1909–10 season, he participated in the First Category Championship of Catalonia with the modest Star FC, together with his half-brother Miguel.

Death
He fought in the First World War in British aviation being wounded in combat, although he survived.

Honours
Hispania AC
 Copa Macaya: 
 Champions: 1900–01

FC Barcelona
 Catalan championship
 Champions: 1904–05

 Copa de la Coronación: 
 Runner-up: 1902

References

1874 births
Year of death missing
Spanish people of English descent
Spanish people of Basque descent
Sportspeople from Manila
Footballers from Barcelona
Filipino footballers
Spanish footballers
Association football forwards
FC Barcelona players
Migrants from the Spanish East Indies to Spain